Cuyamaca (Kumeyaay: ‘Ekwiiyemak) is a region of eastern San Diego County. It lies east of the Capitan Grande Indian Reservation in the western Laguna Mountains, north of Descanso and south of Julian. Named for the 1845 Rancho Cuyamaca Mexican land grant, the region is now dominated by the  Cuyamaca Rancho State Park.

The name is a Spanish corruption of the Kumeyaay phrase "'Ekwiiyemak", which means, according to Margaret Langdon's translation, "Behind the clouds".  It has also been translated as "the place where it rains", a reference to the region's higher average precipitation than San Diego County's low coastal areas. Cuyamaca is a popular toponym lending its name to streets, businesses and a community college in the San Diego area.

History
During the Julian Gold Rush, a quartz gold mine; the Stonewall Mine, was found on the south side of what is now Lake Cuyamaca. First a mining camp called Stonewall (1873–1876), then the mining company town of Stratton (1887–1888), renamed Cuyamaca City (1888–1906), at its peak had a population of 500 and served the Stonewall Mine.

In 1906, the post office was closed and service moved to Descanso. The town was abandoned after mining operations ceased, and few traces of it exist.

The modern community of Cuyamaca later developed on the north side of the lake. Before the Cedar Fire of 2003, the community of Cuyamaca consisted of approximately 145 homes on a mountain (North Peak) north of the reservoir.

Cedar Fire 

In October 2003, most of the Cuyamaca region was consumed by the Cedar Fire. Nearly  in the state park and 120 homes in the community of Cuyamaca were incinerated.  The historic Dyer Ranch house in the center of the state park, which functioned as a museum and the park headquarters, was also destroyed.

Climate

References

External links
Photo of Lake Cuyamaca

Geography of San Diego County, California
East County (San Diego County)
Ghost towns in California
History of San Diego
Kumeyaay
Former settlements in San Diego County, California
Populated places established in 1887